Pia König (born 14 May 1993) is an inactive Austrian tennis player.

König has a career-high WTA singles ranking of 306, achieved on 21 September 2015 and a career-high doubles ranking of world No. 316, reached on 27 February 2017. She has won three singles and 12 doubles titles on tournaments of the ITF Circuit.

Since 2017, König has represented Austria in the Fed Cup with a win–loss record of 0–3.

ITF Circuit finals

Singles: 9 (3 titles, 6 runners-up)

Doubles: 26 (12–14)

References

External links
 
 
 

1993 births
Living people
Austrian female tennis players
People from Klosterneuburg
Sportspeople from Lower Austria